Carabus marietti muchei is a subspecies of black coloured ground beetle in the Carabinae subfamily that is endemic to Turkey.

References

marietti muchei
Beetles described in 1961
Endemic fauna of Turkey